Alzin (also Romanized as Alz̄īn and Alzīn; also known as Alīzīn) is a village in Dast Jerdeh Rural District, Chavarzaq District, Tarom County, Zanjan Province, Iran. At the 2006 census, its population was 435, in 113 families.

References 

Populated places in Tarom County